Muhammad Jamshed Anwar (born 20 November 1974) is a retired Pakistani footballer, who played as a centre-back for WAPDA throughout his career. Anwar made two appearances for Pakistan, scoring 2 goals in 2 appearances.

Anwar plays as a defender and won his first cap against Guam in 2008 where he scored 2 goals.

International

International goals

Goals for Senior National Team

Honours
 Pakistan Premier League: 2004-05, 2007-08, 2008-09

References

1984 births
Living people
Pakistani footballers
Pakistan international footballers
WAPDA F.C. players

Association football defenders